Ministry of Racial Equality of Brazil is a department of the direct public administration of the Federal Government responsible to plan, coordinate and execute public politics of promotion of racial equality and fight against racism in national leve.
The incumbent minister of state who heads the ministry is Anielle Franco.

History
It was created under the name of Special Secretariat of Politics of Promotion of Racial Equality of the Presidency of the Republic (SEPPIR), on 21 March 2003, during the government of Luiz Inácio Lula da Silva, as a secretariat linked to the Presidency and with cabinet-level. The first chief minister was Matilde Ribeiro, social worker and university professor.

List of ministers

Parties
 (5)
 (2)

Status

Organizational structure

Due to the long period it was a child agency in another department, the Ministry of Racial Equality is under a process of redeployment and should follow the organizational structure of the other Brazilian ministries that are composed by the following units and organs:

 Direct and immediate assistance organs: Minister Cabinet; Executive Secretariat; Special Advisory of Internal Control (AECI); Juridical Consultancy (CONJUR).
 Singular specific organs: thematic secretariats that are part of the second-tier of the federal government (these are subdivided in specialized department that form the third-tier).

See also
 Cabinet of Brazil

References

Government ministries of Brazil